4068 Menestheus  is a dark Jupiter trojan from the Greek camp, approximately  in diameter. It was discovered on 19 September 1973, by Dutch astronomers Ingrid and Cornelis van Houten at Leiden, on photographic plates taken by Tom Gehrels at the Palomar Observatory in California, United States. The D-type asteroid belongs to the 60 largest Jupiter trojans and has a rotation period of 14.4 hours. It was named after the Athen leader Menestheus from Greek mythology.

Orbit and classification 

Menestheus is a dark Jovian asteroid orbiting in the leading Greek camp at Jupiter's  Lagrangian point, 60° ahead of the Gas Giant's orbit in a 1:1 resonance (see Trojans in astronomy). It is also a non-family asteroid in the Jovian background population.

It orbits the Sun at a distance of 4.8–5.5 AU once every 11 years and 8 months (4,266 days; semi-major axis of 5.15 AU). Its orbit has an eccentricity of 0.07 and an inclination of 18° with respect to the ecliptic. The body's observation arc begins with its official discovery observation at Palomar in September 1973.

Palomar–Leiden Trojan survey 

While the discovery date aligns with the second Palomar–Leiden Trojan survey, Menestheus has not received a  prefixed survey designation, which was assigned for the discoveries made by the fruitful collaboration between the Palomar and Leiden observatories in the 1960s and 1970s. Gehrels used Palomar's Samuel Oschin telescope (also known as the 48-inch Schmidt Telescope), and shipped the photographic plates to Ingrid and Cornelis van Houten at Leiden Observatory where astrometry was carried out. The trio are credited with the discovery of several thousand asteroids.

Physical characteristics 

In both the Tholen- and SMASS-like taxonomy of the Small Solar System Objects Spectroscopic Survey (S3OS2), Menestheus is a dark D-type asteroid. It has also been generically assumed to be a carbonaceous C-type asteroid.

Rotation period 

Between January 2013, and July 2017, four rotational lightcurves of Menestheus have been obtained from photometric observations by Robert Stephens, Daniel Coley and Brian Warner at the Center for Solar System Studies in collaboration with Linda French, Lawrence Wasserman and other astronomers. Analysis of the best-rated lightcurve gave a rotation period of 14.40 hours with a consolidated brightness amplitude between 0.18 and 0.40 magnitude.

Diameter and albedo 

According to the surveys carried out by the Infrared Astronomical Satellite IRAS, the Japanese Akari satellite and the NEOWISE mission of NASA's Wide-field Infrared Survey Explorer, Menestheus measures between 67.625 and 68.46 kilometers in diameter and its surface has an albedo between 0.061 and 0.069. The Collaborative Asteroid Lightcurve Link derives an albedo of 0.0722 and a diameter of 62.28 kilometers based on an absolute magnitude of 9.5.

Naming 

This minor planet was named from Greek mythology after Menestheus, the commander of the Greek contingent from Athens during the Trojan War. The official naming citation was published by the Minor Planet Center on 11 March 1990.

Notes

References

External links 
 Asteroid Lightcurve Database (LCDB), query form (info )
 Dictionary of Minor Planet Names, Google books
 Discovery Circumstances: Numbered Minor Planets (1)-(5000) – Minor Planet Center
 
 

004068
Discoveries by Cornelis Johannes van Houten
Discoveries by Ingrid van Houten-Groeneveld
Discoveries by Tom Gehrels
Named minor planets
19730919